Michele D'Amico (26 August 1900, Ribera, Agrigento - 20 September 1980) was an Italian politician. He represented the Italian Communist Party in the Constituent Assembly of Italy from 1946 to 1948 and in the Chamber of Deputies from 1948 to 1953.

References

1900 births
1980 deaths
People from Ribera, Agrigento
Italian Communist Party politicians
Members of the Constituent Assembly of Italy
Deputies of Legislature I of Italy
Politicians from the Province of Agrigento